Ricardo Alberto Córdoba Mosque, more commonly known as Ricardo Cordoba, (born 11 October 1983 in Santa Marta, Panama) is a Panamanian professional boxer who fights in the super bantamweight division.

Professional career
Cordoba turned professional in September 2000. In his debut at the Gimnasio de los Leones, David, Panama, Cordoba defeated fellow debutant Hussein Sanchez with a knockout in the first round.

On September 18, 2008, Cordoba defeated Luis Pérez via twelve-round unanimous decision in Panama City for the vacant WBA Interim Super Bantamweight Title.

Cordoba was promoted to the full-fledge WBA Super Bantamweight champion on November 21, 2008 after fellow-Panamanian Celestino Caballero won an IBF title to become unified champion.

Cordoba lost his WBA title to Irishman Bernard Dunne on March 21, 2009, being knocked out in the 11th (of 12) round.

Cordoba is now an attorney in Panama.

Professional Record

References

External links

|-

1983 births
Living people
People from Bugaba District
World Boxing Association champions
World super-bantamweight boxing champions
Panamanian male boxers